Very Berry may refer to:

 Very Berry, Starburst (candy)
 Very Berry, Airborne (dietary supplement)
 Very Berry (EP), 2016 mini-album by South Korean girl group Berry Good
 Very Berry Production Rina Koike
 Very Berry, startup by Nikhil Kartha